This is a list of summer camps throughout the world by category. A summer camp  is a supervised program for children or teenagers conducted during the summer months in some countries.

Traditional Camps 

Adirondack Woodcraft Camps
Camp Agawam
Camp Androscoggin
Falling Creek Camp
Cheley Colorado Camps
Camp Fern
Camp Greylock
Camp Highlands
Camp Kabeyun
Camp Merrie-Woode
Camp Northway
Camp Pathfinder
Holiday Home Camp
Keewaydin

Religious Camps

Christian Camps

Camp Gray (Catholic), Wisconsin
Camp Iawah (Christian), Godfrey, Ontario, Canada
Camp Ondessonk (Catholic), Illinois
Camp Unirondack (Unitarian Universalist), New York
Christian Service Brigade (Non-Denominational), New York
Especially for Youth (Church of Jesus Christ of Latter-day Saints), Utah
The Wilds, (Protestant), North Carolina
Camp Saint Christopher, (Anglican), Seabrook Island, South Carolina

Jewish Camps

Seventh-Day Adventist Camps

Sports Camps

IMG Academy
Kutsher's Sports Academy
Woodward Camp

Sleep-Away Camps

Big Lake Youth Camp
Brant Lake Camp
Camp Agawam, Raymond, Maine
Camp Beaverbrook
Camp Canadensis
Camp El Tesoro
Camp Highlands
Camp Horseshoe for Boys
Camp Ondessonk
Camp Scatico
Camp Wekeela
Farm & Wilderness
Forest Lake Camp
Incarnation Camp
Island Lake Camp
Row New York

Large network camps

Camps International
Camps International (2002), an international volunteer travel operator headquartered in Ringwood, Hampshire UK and Dubai, UAE.

Camp Kesem 
Camp Kesem throughout United States.

Camp Quest 
 Camp Quest (1996 in the US), an organization of 13 affiliated camps established in US, UK, Switzerland and Norway.

Boy Scout Camps (Worldwide)

Boy Scout Camps (US) 

There are hundreds of camps hosted by the Boy Scouts of America; some of these include:
Camp Babcock-Hovey, of the Seneca Waterways Council in the Finger Lakes Region of New York
Camp Brule', of the Five Rivers Council in Sullivan County, Pennsylvania
Camp Onway, formerly of the Yankee Clipper Council in Raymond, New Hampshire
Camp Wanocksett, of the Nashua Valley Council in Dublin, New Hampshire
Firestone Scout Reservation, of the Los Angeles Area Council east of Diamond Bar, California
Forest Lawn Scout Reservation, of the Los Angeles Area Council near Lake Arrowhead, California
Goshen Scout Reservation, of the National Capital Area Council near Goshen, Virginia
Hawk Mountain Scout Reservation, of the Hawk Mountain Council north of Strausstown, Pennsylvania
LeFeber Northwoods Camps, of the Milwaukee County Council near Laona, Wisconsin
June Norcross Webster Scout Reservation, of the Connecticut Rivers Council in Ashford, Connecticut
Log Cabin Wilderness Camp, of the Los Angeles Area Council at Yosemite National Park
Ockanickon Scout Reservation, of the Bucks County Council in Bucks County, Pennsylvania
Owasippe Scout Reservation, of the Chicago Area Council in Twin Lake, Michigan
Rodney Scout Reservation, of the Del-Mar-Va Council in Cecil County, Maryland
Spanish Trail Scout Reservation, of the Gulf Coast Council in DeFuniak Springs, Florida
Ten Mile River Scout Reservation, of the Greater New York Councils near Narrowsburg, New York
Yawgoog Scout Reservation, of the Narragansett Council in Rockville, Rhode Island
Winnebago Scout Reservation, of the Patriots' Path Council in Rockaway, New Jersey

Boys Scouts Camps (Canada) 

Scouts Canada operates about 200 Scout camps across Canada.

YMCA/YWCA Camps

YMCA/YWCA Camps (Canada) 
Big Cove YMCA Camp, Nova Scotia, Canada
YWCA Camp Davern, Maberly, Ontario, Canada
 YMCA Camp Queen Elizabeth, London, Ontario, Canada
YMCA Wanakita, Haliburton, Ontario, Canada
YMCA Camp Elphinstone, Gibsons, British Columbia, Canada

YMCA/YWCA Camps (United States) 
Camp Becket, YMCA summer camp for boys, Becket, Massachusetts
Camp Dudley, YMCA, Westport, New York
Camp Hazen YMCA, Chester, Connecticut
Phantom Lake YMCA Camp, Mukwonago, Wisconsin
YMCA Camp Arbutus Hayo-Went-Ha for Girls, Michigan
YMCA Camp Cory, Milo, New York
YMCA Camp Fitch on Lake Erie, Springfield Township, Erie County, Pennsylvania
YMCA Camp Hayo-Went-Ha for Boys, Michigan
YMCA Camp Jones Gulch, La Honda, California
YMCA Camp Orkila, Orcas Island, Washington state
YMCA Camp Seymour, Gig Harbor, Washington
YMCA Camp Tecumseh, Lafayette, Indiana
YWCA Camp Westwind, Oregon Coast

Camp Fire Camps 

Camp Namanu, Sandy, Oregon
Camp Sealth, Vashon Island, Washington
Camp Wyandot, Hocking Hills, Ohio

Arts and Education Camps 

Adventures of the Mind
Minnesota Institute for Talented Youth

Arts, Music, and Drama Camps 

American Musical and Dramatic Academy (AMDA) High School Summer Conservatory
Appel Farm Arts Camp, New Jersey
Aspen Music Festival and School
Camp Belvoir Terrace for Girls, Massachusetts
Blue Lake Fine Arts Camp
Bowdoin International Music Festival
Buck's Rock Performing and Creative Arts Camp
CAMMAC, Harrington, Quebec, Canada
Cazadero Performing Arts Camp, California
French Woods Festival of the Performing Arts
Greenwood Music Camp, Massachusetts
Harand Camp of the Theatre Arts, Wisconsin
Interlochen Arts Camp, Interlochen, Michigan
International Music Camp, North Dakota
Island Lake Sports & Art Center, Starrucca, Pennsylvania
Lyceum Music Festival, American Fork, Utah
Meadowmount School of Music, Westport, New York
Midwest Young Artists Conservatory, Highwood, Illinois
New England Music Camp, Sidney, Maine
Ottawa Little Theatre Summer Drama Camps, Ottawa, Ontario, Canada
Ottawa Little Theatre Youth Workshops
Rocky Mountain Conservatory Theatre, Colorado (Denver), Florida and Illinois
School of the Art Institute of Chicago, Chicago, Illinois
Sitka Fine Arts Camp, Sitka, Alaska
Stagedoor Manor, Loch Sheldrake, New York
Verbier Festival, Verbier, Switzerland
The Walden School
YouthWrite, Bragg Creek, Alberta

Math and Science Camps 

Canada/USA Mathcamp, USA and Canada
Mathematical Olympiad Program, Nebraska

Space Camps
European Space Camp, Norway
Kennedy Space Center, Florida
Space Camp Catalonia, Spain
Space Camp Turkey, Turkey
United States Space Camp, Alabama

Computer Camps 

Digital Media Academy, California headquarters and camps throughout the US, plus Canada
iD Tech Camps, California headquarters and nationwide camps (US)
National Computer Camps, Connecticut, Georgia and Ohio
Vision Tech Camps, California

Language Camps 

Canoe Island French Camp, Canoe Island, Washington
Concordia Language Villages, Minnesota
Al-Wāḥa, Arabic village, Minnesota
Lac du Bois French villages, Minnesota
Sjölunden, Swedish village, Minnesota
Waldsee, German village, Minnesota

Camps Focused on Health, Medical Conditions, and Special Needs

Barton Center for Diabetes Education (including Clara Barton Camp), Massachusetts, Connecticut, and New York
Camp Akeela, Vermont
Camp Bloomfield, California
Camp Double H Ranch, New York
Camp Dragonfly Forest, Pennsylvania
Camp Lee Mar, Pennsylvania
Camp Meadowood Springs, Oregon
Camp Tuolumne Trails, California
Camp Wonder, California
Happiness is Camping, New Jersey
Hole in the Wall Gang Camp, Connecticut
NJ 'Y' Round Lake Camp, Pennsylvania
Ramapo for Children, New York
Summit Camp & Travel, Pennsylvania

Other Camps

Other Camps (Canada) 
 Camp Beaver Creek, Saskatchewan, Canada
 Des Grèves Vacation Camp, Quebec
 Camp et Auberge du Lac en Coeur, Quebec, Canada
 Camp Manitou, Ontario
 Camp Northway, Ontario, Canada
 Camp Ouareau, girl's camp, Québec, Canada
 Camp Pathfinder for Boys, Canada
 Summer Science Day Camp, British Columbia, Canada
 Camp Val Notre-Dame, Quebec
 Camp White Pine, Ontario, Canada

Other camps (United States) 
 Camp Androscoggin for Boys, Maine
 Camp Anokijig, Wisconsin
 Camp Becket for Boys / Camp Chimney Corners for Girls, Massachusetts
 Camp Belknap for Boys, New Hampshire
 Camp Billings, Vermont
 Camp Bucks Rock, Connecticut
 Camp Calvin Crest, California
 Camp Canadensis, Pennsylvania
 Echo Hill Ranch, Texas
 Camp Chewonki, Maine
 Camp Firwood, Washington
 Eden Village Camp, New York
 Falling Creek Camp for Boys, North Carolina
 Forest Lake Camp, New York
 Geneva Glen Camp, Colorado
 Camp Glacier View Ranch, Colorado
 Camp Gray, Wisconsin
 Camp Greylock, Massachusetts
 Camp Greystone, North Carolina
 Camp Highlands, Wisconsin
 Camp Horseshoe for Boys, Wisconsin
 Camp Joslin for Boys, Massachusetts
 Camp Kabeyun for Boys, New Hampshire
 Camp Keewaydin for Boys / Camp Songadeewin for Girls, Vermont
 Encampment for Citizenship, New York
 Camp Kutsher, Massachusetts
 Camp Letts, Maryland
 Camp Lohikan, Pennsylvania
 Camp Lourdes, New York
 Mahaffey Camp, Pennsylvania
 Camp Manitou, Maine and Ontario
 Camp Mataponi for Girls, Maine
 Camp Merrie-Woode, North Carolina
 Camp Mo Ranch, Texas
 Camp Mountain Meadow Ranch, California
 Camp North Star for Boys, Wisconsin
 Camp Onyahsa, New York
 Camp Quest, Virginia
 Camp Quest UK, United Kingdom
 Raquette Lake Camps, New York
 Red Arrow Camp, Wisconsin
 Camp Rising Sun, New York and Denmark
 Camp Rockmont for Boys, North Carolina
 Camp Seymour, Washington
 Camp Timanous, Maine
 Tyler Hill Camp, Pennsylvania
 Camp Unirondack, New York
 Valley Mill Camp, Maryland
 Camp Wawona, California
 Camp Wekeela, Maine
 Camp Winnarainbow, California
 Woodward Camp, Pennsylvania

Former Camps 

Big Doe Camp, Canada
Camp Beaverbrook, California
Camp Diana-Dalmaqua, New York
Camp Ma-Ho-Ge, New York
Camp Naomi, Massachusetts and Maine
Camp Ranger, New York
Camps Mohican Reena, Massachusetts
Camp Watonka for Boys, Pennsylvania
Kutsher's Camp Anawana, New York

References 

 
Lists of organizations